Ratatouille is a 2007 platform video game developed by Heavy Iron Studios and published by THQ. It is based on the Pixar  animation film of same name.

Plot
Similar to the plot of the movie, the game starts in a farm setting. Remy goes off with his brother Emile to retrieve apple cores for his father Django. On the road trip he is taught the basic skills he will need to know so that he can pass what he will face later on. After the tutorial Remy and Emile grab a Guesteu Chef book so Remy could read it. They pull the book out of the window which results in it shutting awakening the old lady who fires at the colony with a shotgun. Remy escapes with the book, and the colony escapes on homemade boats. Remy ends up taking a wrong turn in the sewers and ends up lost from his family. A imaginative vision of Guesteu pops from the book and tells Remy that he could regain one of his lost stars after Anton Ego’s bad review. Remy agrees and travels under Paris’s streets and ends up at the restaurant. However Remy falls from the window and lands in a sink. Remy attempts to escape but gets side tracked by a bad smelling soup  that was contaminated by the new garbage boy Linguini . Remy makes the soup much better and nearly escapes down a kitchen pipe which ends up back in the sewers. Remy reunites with Django, and Emile and tells them that them and the other rats are going to steal dog scraps at the restaurant. The plan works successfully, but it results in Linguini chasing Remy when he sees the other rats leaving. Linguini crashes into some garbage cans and the two make a deal to have Remy help Linguini out in the kitchen. Remy then leaves down another pipe, and meets up with his dad again.

This part also gives more exploration of the sewers including a bonus level and objects that decorate the colony’s home. Remy returns to the kitchen to steal from the cooler and Remy helps Linguini three times when he’s given a special order. Remy turns off the gas which distracts the chefs and steals the key to open the cooler. The colony steals the food but the Head Chef Skinner spots him. Skinner chases Remy throughout the kitchen, but Skinner slips on a mop, and crashes into a pile of pots and pans Remy escapes through the cooler’s pipes and meets with Django for their next heist.

Remy helps his colony steal prized foods at the market, but Skinner and the old lady from the cottage chase him. Skinner is then trapped in a freezer and escapes again. After that, the food critic Anton Ego, also known as the "Grim Eater," has arrived at Gusteau's for a review; one that will be important to the cooks. However, with the exception of Linguini and the rôtisseuse Colette, they all leave after finding out about Remy. Now it is up to Remy, his rat colony, Linguini, and Colette to cook for many people, including the critic Ego. Remy decides to cook Ratatouille for the night, impressing Ego. Skinner, furious by the food's delicacy, chases Remy throughout the Gusteau's restaurant, wrecking it in the process. While Remy manages to escape from Skinner (who is later crushed accidentally by the chandelier), the restaurant's credibility is lost due to the revelation of the rat colony's existence and is forced to close down. However, with Ego's funding, Linguini and Colette manage to open a bistro called "La Ratatouille" with Remy as its head chef.

Development
Disney announced in November 2006 a Ratatouille video game release, which would coincide with the movie. Several of the actors from the film voice their characters in the game, including Patton Oswalt as Remy.

Reception

Ratatouille received "mixed or average" reviews, according to review aggregator Metacritic.

Alex Navarro of GameSpot gave most versions of the game a score of 6 out of 10 and called it "a sufficient, if unfulfilling, platformer". Navarro wrote: "There's little difference to speak of between any of the older console, PC, or Wii versions of Ratatouille. The PC version predictably looks the sharpest, and the PS2 version looks the dullest, though the differences are minor all around" and said "the PC version requires a decent gamepad to play properly, and the Wii version dabbles in motion controls". Navarro said the gameplay is fine for younger players but too simplistic for older players. He said the film's cast gives solid voice work but that the missions are a bit dull and repetitive. Navarro wrote "if your kid is desperate to relive Remy's adventures for him or herself, Ratatouille isn't a bad game to rent" and also wrote "it's the sort of game that will satisfy a younger fan of the film for a few lazy afternoon hours, and then be forgotten about immediately afterward".

Justin Davis of Modojo.com gave the mobile phone version of the game by THQ Wireless a rating of 3 stars out of 5. Davis said the game appears like the game Diner Dash, but it's set in the kitchen instead of the dining area and instead of serving drinks, the player is dropping meat onto a stove, and Linguini's hands are controlled independently. Davis said the game was a "pleasant surprise" but that it was a little too short, with not enough depth. Louis Bedigian of GameZone gave the mobile phone version a score of 7.7 out of 10, and IGN gave it 7.5.

The game shipped nearly 4 million copies.

The video game won the award for the "Best Animated Video Game" award at the Annies in 2008.

Notes

References

External links
 
 
 
 
 

2007 video games
3D platform games
Annie Award for Best Animated Video Game winners
Asobo Studio games
Disney video games
Game Boy Advance games
GameCube games
Games for Windows certified games
MacOS games
Nintendo DS games
PlayStation 2 games
PlayStation 3 games
PlayStation Portable games
Video game
Single-player video games
THQ games
Video games about food and drink
Video games about mice and rats
Video games based on animated films
Video games based on films
Video games based on works by Brad Bird
Video games developed in the United States
Video games scored by Andrea Datzman
Video games scored by Chad Seiter
Video games scored by Michael Giacchino
Video games scored by Tim Simonec
Video games set in France
Video games set in Paris
Video games using Havok
Video games with alternative versions
Wii games
Windows games
Xbox 360 games
Xbox games